Daniel Lyon may refer to:

 Super Dragon, real name Daniel Lyon
Danny Lyon, American photographer and filmmaker
Daniel Lyon (musician), vocalist/guitarist in Pomegranates (band)

See also
Daniel Lyons (disambiguation)